Lardgaram-e Bala (also Romanized as Lardgaram-e Bālā) is a village in Tarom Rural District, in the Central District of Hajjiabad County, Hormozgan Province, Iran. At the 2006 census, its population was 46, in 10 families.

References 

Populated places in Hajjiabad County